The first season of The Voice Kids was a Philippine reality singing competition on ABS-CBN. It was based on the Dutch reality competition of the same name. Lea Salonga, Sarah Geronimo, and Bamboo Mañalac who also sits as coaches in the adult version, are the coaches of the show. It was hosted by Luis Manzano, along with Alex Gonzaga as the show's backstage host. The show was set to premiere in April 2014, but was moved to May 24, 2014. It aired at 6:45 p.m. (PST) every Saturdays, and at 7:30 p.m. (PST) every Sundays.

The show ended on July 27, 2014 with Lyca Jane Gairanod of Team Sarah being declared as the first grand champion.

Development
On November 18, 2013, Lauren Dyogi, the franchise's business unit head, announced on Twitter that there will be a kids version of The Voice of the Philippines. The franchise was launched after the success of the first season of the main version which had garnered high ratings and was trending topic online. Auditions schedule were later announced in the same month.

On March 9, 2014, the show released its first teaser. On March 17, 2014, the production team of the program started to provide updates of the filming of the Blind auditions, posting teasers of the new improved set and chairs and of the coaches in the show's official social media accounts. A second teaser was aired on April 2, 2014. Three teasers, one for each coach, were aired on April 17, 2014. In May, the show aired its first Blind audition teaser.

Coaches and host

At first, there were rumors that an unnamed Filipino singer who is popular in Asia, and a Filipina singer who is known for winning an international reality singing competition will sit as coaches for this series. Later on the January 15, 2014 interview by Push, Lea Salonga confirmed that she will join as one of the coaches for the inaugural season of The Voice Kids. Salonga also confirmed that there will only be three coaches in this show, and coach apl.de.ap will not be part of this version. On March 7, 2014, Salonga confirmed on her Twitter that Sarah Geronimo and Bamboo Mañalac will be part of the kids version of the show.

On February 10, 2014 interview of Toni Gonzaga in Banana Nite, Toni Gonzaga confirmed that she will not be hosting the kids version. On March 11, 2014, a rumor was circulating online that Luis Manzano and Alex Gonzaga will be hosting the show. By March 14, the rumor was becoming stronger as The Voice Kids team published a teaser, through the franchise's official Instagram,  of an image of two silhouette individuals described as the hosts of the show. Few netizens commented that the silhouette figures highly resembled those of Luis Manzano and Alex Gonzaga. On March 17, 2014, it was confirmed by the official PR website of ABS-CBN that the show will be hosted by Luis Manzano and Alex Gonzaga.

Auditions

The show was created after the main version garnered immense popularity and high television ratings. ABS-CBN later announced that auditions will start November 2013. Later in January 2014, auditions for the Luzon, Metro Manila, Visayas, and Mindanao regions were announced and will be held together with the auditions for the second season of The Voice of the Philippines.

More than ten thousand kids auditioned for the first season.

Prizes
The winner of The Voice Kids will receive one million peso contract from MCA Music, house and lot from Camella Homes, music and home appliance showcases, ₱1,000,000, and ₱1,000,000 worth of trust fund from Systema.

Teams
Color key

Blind auditions
In an article Lea Salonga wrote in Philippine Daily Inquirer and was published on January 16, 2014, she said the blind auditions will be filmed by March. On March 15, 2014, Sarah Geronimo, in an interview by Jocelyn Dimaculangan from the Philippine Entertainment Portal, revealed that the first day of Blind auditions will be filmed on March 17, 2014. It was filmed until March 20, 2014 at Studio 10 of ABS-CBN Broadcasting Center in Quezon City, Metro Manila. More than 100 kids were invited for the Blind auditions.

In a Philippine Daily Inquirer article posted by Salonga on March 20, 2014, she said that each team will be composed of 18 artists.

It aired from May 24 to June 22 for 10 episodes with a total of 84 aspiring contestants.

Color key

Episode 1 (May 24)
On its first episode, the coaches performed an opening number. Sarah Geronimo sang "Right Now" first, then followed by Bamboo singing "Happy", and Lea Salonga singing "Story of My Life." After their individual performances, all the three of them together performed "Live While We're Young."

Episode 2 (May 25)

Episode 3 (May 31)

Episode 4 (June 1)

Episode 5 (June 7)

Episode 6 (June 8)

Episode 7 (June 14)

Episode 8 (June 15)

Episode 9 (June 21)

Episode 10 (June 22)

The Battles

Filming began on June 23 to 25, 2014. From more than 100 kids invited to the Blind auditions only 54 artists advanced to the Battles, where each coach will pick three artists and pit them together into a battle of vocals. The winner of the battle will only be determined by his or her coach while other coaches can only provide their comments to the performances of the artists. The winner will earn a spot in the six artist-slots per team and will advance to the next round, the Sing-offs.

All coaches were aided by Annie Quintos of The Company in vocally coaching the artists during the Battles.

The first episode of the Battles will air on June 28, 2014, while the Sing-offs' first episode will air on June 29, 2014.

Color key

On June 28, 2014, Team Lea, headed by Lea Salonga, opened the show in singing Sara Bareilles's "Brave." On the opening of the July 5, 2014 episode, Team Bamboo, headed by Bamboo Mañalac, sang Rivermaya's "Awit ng Kabataan." On the July 12, 2014 episode, Team Sarah, headed by Sarah Geronimo, sang Demi Lovato's "Neon Lights."

The Sing-offs
The Sing-offs immediately follows the Battles. Per team, two artists will be chosen by their respective coaches for the Live shows. Unlike the Battles where the coach picks for the song what the artists are going to sing, in the Sing-offs the decision is solely done by the artists.

The first Sing-offs episode was aired on June 29, 2014.

Color key

Note

  Lyca Gairanod sang the Tagalog version of "Dance with My Father."

Live shows
The Live shows were held in Newport Performing Arts Theater, Resorts World Manila, Newport City, Pasay starting from July 19, 2014.

Unlike in the first season of the main version of the franchise, the outcome in the Live shows of the kids version will solely be from the results of the public's votes. Voting lines will be opened every Saturdays after all the performances of the artists, and will end on Sundays. In the semifinals, the top four artists coming from the results of the public votes will advance to the Finals.

Color key

Week 1: Semifinals (July 19 & 20)

Week 2: Finals (July 26 & 27)
The voting mechanics for the Live finals will be based on the accumulated votes per round: power ballad round, upbeat song round, and a duet with a celebrity round. Voting lines will only be opened between the end and the start of each rounds. At the end of the three rounds, all votes will be tallied and the artist gaining the highest accumulated votes will be declared as the winner.

The first episode of the Finals was opened by the top four artists with their medley rendition of Sponge Cola's "Bitiw," Rocksteddy's "Superhero," and Sandwich's "Sugod."

On the second episode of the Finals, the show was opened by the top four artists of the first season of The Voice of the Philippines, the three coaches, and the top four artists singing American Authors' "Best Day of My Life" and New Radicals' "You Get What You Give."

After being declared as the champion, Lyca Gairanod sang "Narito Ako."

Color key

Elimination Chart

Results Summary 

 Color key
 Artist's info

 Result details

Teams 

 Artist's info

 Result details

Notable Artists 

 Julia Klarisse Base, was discovered in an ABS-CBN talent search called Kapamilya Little Star.
 Amy Nobleza, appeared on Pinoy Dream Academy: Little Dreamers in 2008 on ABS-CBN and ended as the runner-up of the show.
 Peter Angelo Echaluse, appeared on the fourth season of Star Circle Quest: Search for the Next Kiddie Superstars. He was known as "The Small Boy with a Big Voice. He joins the Magic Circle of 6 and ended as one of the runners-up.
 Rosarely Avila later appeared on the second season of Idol Philippines, under the screen name Ryssi Avila, who ended up as the runner-up of the show.
 Sam Shoaf is the son of Arnee Hidalgo, who later competed in the second season of The Voice of the Philippines. He became one of the six original hosts of the children's show Team Yey! during the first two seasons. He later appeared on the first season of Your Face Sounds Familiar Kids, together with Lyca Gairanod. Sam finished in sixth, while Lyca finished in seventh respectively.
 Nathan Bautista, appeared on the second season of Promil Pre-school i-Shine Talent Camp on ABS-CBN. He ended as one of the runners-up in the show, and was also awarded with the Best Talent in Singing. He later appeared in the fifth season of Pilipinas Got Talent, as a member of the band The Chosen Ones and finished in eleventh place. 
 Kyle Bernido later appeared on the second season of Tawag ng Tanghalan and won as daily winner but she lost to Quarter II semi-finalist Rico Garcia. She later returned on its fourth season, under the screen name, Nikole Kyle Bernido and finished in sixth place.
 Darren Espanto, appeared on the fifth season of The Next Star, a Canadian reality television show on YTV. He was one of the Top 6 finalists.
 Darlene Vibares later became a member of the P-pop group YGIG.

Reception

Television ratings
Television ratings for the first season of The Voice of the Philippines on ABS-CBN were gathered from two major sources, namely from AGB Nielsen and Kantar Media. AGB Nielsen's survey ratings were gathered from Mega Manila households, while Kantar Media's survey ratings were gathered from urban and rural households all over the Philippines.

References

External links
 The Voice Kids (season 1) on ABS-CBN

The Voice of the Philippines
The Voice Kids (Philippine TV series)
2014 Philippine television seasons